The , known in official  records as , and alternatively known as , or , is a type of metro car which was manufactured by Hungarian companies  ("Ganz-MÁVAG Locomotive, Carriage and Machine Factory") and  ("Ganz Electric Factory"). The  metro cars are articulated, 8-axle rail motor coaches with an unusual 2'Bo'Bo'2'tr axle arrangement. They are not capable of operating as electric multiple units. The cars were manufactured in Budapest between 1971 and 1973 and in 1987, and including the two prototype cars, in overall 23 units were made.

MFAV metro cars are still in active service, although their retirement has been called for. The first car entered passenger service in 1973, thus the type is now in continuous service for  years. The series carries the distinction of being an early example of fully low-floor urban rail vehicles.

Design and manufacturing 

The MFAV cars are based on the CSMG tramcars, but the geometrical constraints of the M1 metro line forced Ganz to modify the existing design in unique ways, such as moving the electric subsystems into the articulations between the body sections to achieve fully low-floor vehicles. From the four bogies of the cars, the inner two are driven, which, due to the weight distribution over the bogies, gives the vehicles better traction dynamics.

Eventually MFAV metro cars were produced in two production runs, these are shown in the following table.

References and notes

See also 

 Ganz CSMG
 Budapest Metro
 Ganz Works
 Articulated vehicle

Ganz Works
Rolling stock of Hungary
Train-related introductions in 1973
600 V DC multiple units